Benton Municipal Airport  is a city-owned, public-use airport located  west of the central business district of Benton, a city in Franklin County, Illinois, United States. This airport is included in the FAA's National Plan of Integrated Airport Systems (2009-2013), which categorizes it as a general aviation airport. The airport was named 2014 Illinois General Aviation Airport of the Year.

Facilities and Aircraft 
It has one runway designated 18/36 with an asphalt surface measuring 4,002 by 75 feet (1,220 x 23 m). The runway was expanded in 2003; it previously measured 2,720 by 60 feet (829 x 18 m).

The aircraft offers a number of services for local and transient aircraft, including tie-downs and hangars for parking. A local flight club is based at the airport to provide flight training and aircraft rental.

For the 12-month period ending July 31, 2019, the airport had just over 8,000 aircraft operations, an average of 22 per day: 94% general aviation, 5% air taxi and 1% military. At that time there were 9 aircraft based at this airport, all airplanes: 8 single-engine and 1 multi-engine.

References

External links 

Airports in Illinois
Buildings and structures in Franklin County, Illinois